Gortin St Patrick's is a Gaelic Athletic Association club based in the village of Gortin in County Tyrone, Northern Ireland.

Honours 
 Tyrone Intermediate Football Championship 
 1989, 2003
 Tyrone Junior Football Championship
 1961

External links
 Gortin GAA

Gaelic games clubs in County Tyrone
Gaelic football clubs in County Tyrone